SHERPA is a commercial satellite dispenser developed by Andrews Space, a subsidiary of Spaceflight Industries, and was unveiled in 2012. The maiden flight was on 3 December 2018 on a Falcon 9 Block 5 rocket, and it consisted of two separate unpropelled variants of the dispenser.

Riding atop the launcher's final stage, SHERPA's release follows deployment of the primary mission payload for the dispensing of minisatellites, microsatellites, or nanosatellites such as CubeSats. SHERPA builds upon the capabilities of the Spaceflight Secondary Payload System (SSPS) by incorporating propulsion and power generation subsystems, which creates a propulsive tug dedicated to maneuvering to an optimal orbit to place secondary and hosted payloads.

Overview

SHERPA is a three-axis stabilized platform capable of on-orbit maneuvering meant to deploy small satellites carried as secondary payloads on rideshare orbital  launches. SHERPA is integrated to the rocket as a standard adapter that is designed to fit on the SpaceX Falcon 9, Orbital Sciences Corp.'s Antares, and United Launch Alliance's Atlas V and Delta rockets. SHERPA is to be separated from the launch vehicle prior to any deployments.

SHERPA is a commercial derivative of the ESPA Grande ring, and it was developed and manufactured by Andrews Space, a subsidiary of Spaceflight Industries since 2010 and was unveiled in May 2012. Spaceflight Industries fabricates SHERPA, and the SSPS, at its facility in Tukwila, Washington.

Riding atop the launcher's final stage, SHERPA is to be separated from the launch vehicle prior to any deployments or dispensing of minisatellites, microsatellites, nanosatellites and CubeSats. SHERPA features an optional propulsion system to place its payloads in an orbit other than the primary payload's orbit. The powered variants are capable of large orbit change.

SHERPA's first mission was to deploy 90 small payloads, during a 2015 launch on a Falcon 9 rocket, then it was rescheduled for 2017, but delays caused in part by a Falcon 9 rocket explosion on a launch pad in 2016, prompted Spaceflight to cancel the mission.

SpaceX appears to have severed ties with Spaceflight Inc., but has continued to fly manifested missions with the last launch on 25 May 2022.

Variants

Standard SHERPA 
There are at least five SHERPA variants: SHERPA (non-propelled), SHERPA 400, 1000, 2200  and FX. Each SHERPA is able to be launched in a stacked configuration with other SHERPA modules for later separation and independent free-flying.  

SHERPA
The basic SHERPA is based on a commonly-used secondary payload adapter known as an ESPA ring and it is not propelled. It is used for low Earth orbit deployments, and can unfurl a dragsail to lower its orbit before payload deployment.   

SHERPA 400
The 400 variant is used for low Earth orbit deployments, and it features two tanks with mono-propellant. It is capable of accompanying a primary payload to 800 km and then lower its orbit to a more favorable altitude to drop off secondaries. Most small satellites are required to orbit at about 450 kilometers to deorbit or move to an unused orbit within 25 years of the mission's completion.

SHERPA 1000
This variant features additional monopropellant volume stored in 4 tanks.

SHERPA 2200
The 2200 variant has a fueled mass of 2,000 kg and it features a more powerful bi-propellant fuel (stored in 4 tanks) for the delivery of small payloads to geostationary transfer orbit (GTO) as well as the lunar environs.

SHERPA-NG 
SHERPA-FX

The FX variant, intended to be flown on board a SpaceX Falcon 9 Block 5 is an optional third stage for delivery of deployable and hosted payloads in low earth orbit (LEO) and polar orbit (SSO).

SHERPA-AC

Augmented version of the free-flying SHERPA-FX equipped with attitude knowledge & control capabilities and a flight computer, optimized for hosted payloads.

SHERPA-LTC

SHERPA LTC is an optional third stage that utilizes a bi-propellant propulsion system to deliver satellites and hosted payloads to low earth orbit (LEO) and polar orbit (SSO).

SHERPA-LTE

SHERPA LTE is an optional third stage that utilizes a Xenon propulsion system to deliver satellites and hosted payloads to Geostationary orbit (GEO), Cislunar, or Earth-escape orbits.

SHERPA-ES

SHERPA-ES (SHERPA EScape) is a high-energy SHERPA-NG variant that will utilize a bi-propellant propulsion system to deliver satellites and hosted payloads to geostationary and cislunar orbits. The first flight of this variant, designated "GEO Pathfinder", is planned for late 2022 as a rideshare on the IM-2 mission.

Flight history

References

Space tugs
Spacecraft propulsion